The Aqrab massacre is a contested event which occurred on 10/11 December 2012, during the Syrian civil war, in the Alawite section of the mixed town of Aqrab, Hama Governorate, Syria. The Syrian Observatory for Human Rights claimed that 125 people were killed or wounded in those events, while other activists claimed that as many as 300 people were killed. Activists said that they could confirm the deaths of 10 people.

Background 
In 2011 an uprising began in Syria against the government. A multitude of events include military sieges and the formation of the Free Syrian Army, the events turned into the Syrian civil war. As the ethnic and religious composition was mixed both sides had support from various factions. The ruling party has numerous political leaders belonging to the Alawite minority in Syria, but neither side of the conflict had labeled sectarianism as a major cause of the conflict.

Bombings 
The UK-based Syrian Observatory for Human Rights said that multiple attacks killed or wounded 125 civilians, mostly Alawites, in Aqrab.

SOHR blamed pro-Assad forces for committing the massacre, based on testimony by Alawites held by the FSA.
 However, Alex Thomson, the first western journalist to reach Aqrab, reported that eyewitnesses not held by FSA blamed foreign Islamists and FSA fighters from Houla and Al-Rastan.

An Alawite resident, from the nearby town of Masyaf, blamed the attack on rebels stating that they did not believe there was a massacre, but that they thought the rebels were holding a number of hostages. According to him, the clashes started when the rebels shelled a Shabiha militia checkpoint in the town. In contrast, a rebel claimed that the Syrian army shelled a house where between 200 and 500 Alawites were hiding in.

The next day, the casualty counts still varied but several activists said that they could confirm the deaths of 10 people. SOHR director Rami Abdel Rahma stated that "We cannot know whether the rebels were behind this attack, but if they were, this would be the largest-scale revenge attack against Alawites". The activists also reported to Reuters wounded Alawite children came to an opposition-run field hospital in the Sunni rebel region of Houla.

On 14 December, Alex Thomson of Britain's Channel 4 News filled a report after he managed to travel to the outskirts of Aqrab. He interviewed three people who claimed to have escaped from the village to government-controlled territory, without the presence of any government minders. All three blamed the rebels, not the pro-government Alawite militia, for the killing of Alawites in their village. The report also suggested that there was no massacre at all and Thomson noted that conversations with a dozen other Alawites who had fled from Aqrab further backed up the three witnesses. According to them, hundreds of civilians were trapped in one building, besieged by the rebels, for more than a week. They stated "the rebels wanted to take the women and children to al-Houla to use them as human shields against bombardment from government forces, and they believed they would kill the remaining men". Although the negotiations to free all of the people in the building failed, a number of people were released before some were killed and others were taken to Houla.

See also

 List of massacres during the Syrian civil war

References 

Massacres of the Syrian civil war in 2012
Massacres of the Syrian civil war perpetrated by the Free Syrian Army
Persecution of Alawites
Hama Governorate in the Syrian civil war